Witch camps are settlements where women in Ghana who have been accused of being witches can flee for safety. Women in such camps have been accused of witchcraft for various reasons, including mental illness. Some camps are thought to have been created in the early 20th century. The Ghanaian government has enacted measures to eliminate such camps.

Description 
Women suspected of being witches sometimes flee to witch camp settlements for safety, often in order to avoid being lynched by neighbours.

Many women in such camps are widows; relatives are believed to accuse them of witchcraft in order to seize their late husbands' possessions. Many women in the witch camps also suffer from mental illness, a poorly understood phenomenon in Ghana. In one camp in Gambaga in the north, women are given protection by the local chieftain, and in return, pay him and work in his fields.

The Anti-Witchcraft Allegations Campaign Coalition-Ghana (AWACC-Ghana) has reported that the number of outcasts residing in witch camps is growing, and that food supplies there are insufficient.

Locations 
There are at least six witch camps in Ghana, housing a total of approximately 1,000 women. The camps are located in Bonyasi, Gambaga, Gnani, Kpatinga, Kukuo and Naabuli, all in Northern Ghana. Some of the camps are thought to have been created over 100 years ago.

The Ghanaian government has announced its intent to close the witch camps and educate the public that witches do not exist. In December 2014, Minister for Gender and Social Protection Nana Oye Lithur disbanded the Bonyasi camp located in Central Gonja District and re-integrated its residents into their communities. As of 2015, the Ghanaian government had shut down several witch camps.

See also
 Gambaga Witch camp
 Witchcraft in Ghana
 Prayer camps
 Spirit children
 Ritual servitude
 Fetish priest

References

External links

 Video by Yaba Badoe about women in Ghanaian camps

Women in Ghana
Religion in Ghana
Refugee camps in Africa
Modern witch hunts
African witchcraft
Violence against women in Ghana